Stampin is a name of a township and also a suburb located in Kuching city in the Malaysian state of Sarawak. Administratively, it is located in the Kuching South City Council area. Most of its area is made up of the B.D.C (Borneo Development Corporation) housings and other housing estates such as Hui Sing Garden & Kampung Stutong and Stampin Baru.

Kuching